Woodstock Farm Sanctuary (previously Woodstock Farm Animal Sanctuary) is a farm animal rights and protection organization, founded in 2004. It  provides information related to the production and consumption of animal products through rescue, education, and advocacy.

History
Founders Jenny Brown and Doug Abel moved to Woodstock, New York, in May 2004. Abel is a film editor while Brown has previously worked for ABC, PBS, and Discovery Channel.

Brown and Abel used their wedding as a fundraiser to garner the means to build a barn on their pasture. Woodstock Farm Sanctuary now provides shelter to over 200 cows, pigs, chickens, turkeys, ducks, sheep, rabbits and goats who have been rescued from cases of abuse, neglect and abandonment at a 23-acre animal sanctuary in Woodstock, two hours north of New York City.

In 2015, Brown and Abel decided to move 30 miles south and purchased the 150-acre Epworth Camp and Retreat Center. Brown stated that "We just celebrated our 10-year anniversary in 2014, and we've grown beyond this property. We had no idea we would grow to this size and be as popular. We draw thousands of visitors in the summer." There had been complaints from neighbors in the past. In 2010 concerns from neighbors about loud fundraising concerts led to a discussion about modifying the sanctuary's special use permit. The new location will be more insulated from others. With the move comes a name change from Woodstock Farm Animal Sanctuary to Woodstock Farm Sanctuary.

In October 2016, the co-founders "resigned" from the organization.

See also
Veganism
Factory Farming
Animal Welfare
Animal Rights

References

External links
Woodstock Farm Animal Sanctuary official site
Jenny Brown talks about her book "The Lucky Ones" on the Diane Rehm Show on NPR recorded August 06, 2012.

Animal sanctuaries
Animal rights organizations
Animal welfare organizations based in the United States